5/7 may refer to:
May 7 (month-day date notation)
July 5 (day-month date notation)
5/7 (number), a fraction